R557 road may refer to:
 R557 road (Ireland)
 R557 road (South Africa)